Love Someone may refer to:

"Love Someone" (Brett Eldredge song), 2018
"Love Someone" (Jason Mraz song), 2014
"Love Someone" (Lukas Graham song), 2018
"Love Someone", a song by Miley Cyrus from Younger Now, 2017
Love Someone, a 2021 album by Canadian country music singer Johnny Reid

See also
"If You Love Someone", a 2014 song by the Veronicas
"Love Someone Like Me", a 1987 song by Holly Dunn
Love Somebody (disambiguation)
Someone to Love (disambiguation)
When You Love Someone (disambiguation)
"You Gotta Love Someone", a 1990 song by Elton John